Choi Gwi-hwa (born March 3, 1978) is a South Korean actor.

Career

Choi Gwi-hwa joined the Meulmye Theatre Company in Bucheon in 1997. In 1999 he began honing his screen acting with a large number of short movies, landing his first role in a feature-length film in Why Did You Come To My House (2009). His breakthrough role was that of a deputy chief in the cult hit series Misaeng: Incomplete Life (2014), a satirical exploration of life in a typical Korean office environment. Choi has since made notable performances in Train to Busan (2016), The Wailing (2016), A Taxi Driver (2017), and Bad Guys: Vile City (2017). His scene-stealing performance as a police chief in Ma Dong-seok's The Outlaws led him to be awarded Best New Actor by the Korea Film Director's Network.

Filmography

Film

Television series

TV Movies

Television shows

References

External links
 
 

1978 births
Living people
People from South Jeolla Province
South Korean male television actors
South Korean male film actors
South Korean male stage actors
South Korean male musical theatre actors
21st-century South Korean male actors